John Harlan may refer to:

John Marshall Harlan (1833–1911), US Supreme Court Justice, 1877–1911
John Marshall Harlan II (1899–1971), his grandson, US Supreme Court Justice, 1955–1971
John Harlan (announcer) (1925–2017), American television announcer
John Maynard Harlan (1864–1934), American lawyer and politician in Chicago

See also
John Harlin (1935–1966), American mountaineer and US Air Force pilot